Pierre Zebli (born 12 June 1997) is an Ivorian professional footballer who plays for Bulgarian First League club Lokomotiv Plovdiv as a defensive midfielder.

Career 
Zebli is a youth product of AC Bastia and then Inter Milan. He made his professional debut for Perugia on loan from Inter, in a 2–0 Serie B win over Bari. He formally signed for Perugia in August 2015.

After a couple successful seasons with Perugia, Zebli arrived to Genk on 31 January 2017.

On 7 August 2018, after no appearances in the Belgian league for Genk, he returned to Italy, joining Serie B club Ascoli on a season-long loan. Ascoli held the option of permanent transfer at the end of the loan. On 25 January 2019, Ascoli terminated the loan contract early as Zebli was recovering from two eye surgeries performed to correct detached retina.

In January 2022 he joined Bulgarian team Tsarsko Selo. In June 2022 he signed a three-year contract with another Bulgarian team - Lokomotiv Plovdiv.

International career
Zebli was born in Ivory Coast, and moved to Italy at a young age with his father. Zebli holds both Ivorian and Italian citizenship. He represented the Italy under-21 Serie B representative team in a 4–0 loss to Iran.

Zebli debuted for the Ivory Coast national under-20 football team in a 3–2 win over Qatar U20 on 21 March 2016.

References

External links
 Profile at Perugia
 Profile at Sky Sport (Italy)
 

1997 births
Living people
People from Dabou
Ivorian footballers
Ivory Coast under-20 international footballers
Italian footballers
Ivorian emigrants to Italy
Italian sportspeople of African descent
A.C. Perugia Calcio players
K.R.C. Genk players
Ascoli Calcio 1898 F.C. players
FC Tsarsko Selo Sofia players
PFC Lokomotiv Plovdiv players
Serie B players
Belgian Pro League players
First Professional Football League (Bulgaria) players
Association football midfielders
Ivorian expatriate footballers
Ivorian expatriate sportspeople in Belgium
Expatriate footballers in Belgium
Ivorian expatriate sportspeople in Bulgaria
Expatriate footballers in Bulgaria